The Passing Parade, a.k.a. John Nesbitt's Passing Parade, was an American radio series created, written, and narrated by John Nesbitt which was adapted into an Oscar-winning series of MGM short subjects. In both media, the series usually focused on strange but true historical events, both little known and famous, as well as figures such as Catherine de' Medici and Nostradamus.

Passing Parade on radio
The radio series, developed as an outgrowth of an earlier Nesbitt-produced program (Headlines of the Past), was launched on the NBC network on February 1, 1937, running off and on until 1951 over three different networks and in syndication. Nesbitt's inspiration was a trunk left to him by his father which contained news clippings of odd stories from around the world. Nesbitt, who usually presented his stories without sound effects or music, utilized a research staff of 14 people in verifying the details of his tales, but wrote the final scripts himself, often within an hour of airtime.

Joseph M. Koehler described the unusual nature of the program in a review in the July 31, 1943, issue of Billboard: "There was a time when no one could be sold the idea that one man, without much musical help, could fill a half hour and hold his audience. Nesbitt has disproved the bromide because he's Nesbitt and spins a yarn that's as tight as an Armistice announcement."

The Passing Parade was heard as a segment on The John Charles Thomas Show (1943-1946).

Radio producer/announcer John Doremus later acquired the rights to the series and revived it as a late 1950s-early 1960s syndicated feature, billing his version as "from the files of John Nesbitt."  Over 1500 three-minute episodes were broadcast.

Parade on film
The series of Passing Parade one-reel short subjects was produced for MGM from 1938 to 1949. Most of the films featured the slow movement of Tchaikovsky's Symphony No. 5 as the opening theme music. The directors included Fred Zinnemann and Jacques Tourneur.

The films were re-edited for television syndication by MGM in the early 1960s. These episodes can also be found as DVD extras accompanying some MGM films.

References

External links
"The Passing Parade (anthology, hosted by John Nesbitt)" 
"John Nesbitt (I) (1910–1960)", IMDb
"The Passing Parade - Pgm 10", rand's esoteric otr
"John Nesbitt's Passing Parade", The Classic TV Archive
John Nesbitt filmography, TCM

1930s American radio programs
1940s American radio programs
1950s American radio programs
NBC radio programs
NBC Blue Network radio programs
CBS Radio programs
Mutual Broadcasting System programs
Short film series
Films based on radio series
Metro-Goldwyn-Mayer short films